Dorcadion kastekus is a species of beetle in the family Cerambycidae. It was described by Mikhail Leontievich Danilevsky in 1996. It is known from Kazakhstan.

References

kastekus
Beetles described in 1996